Rome 1960: The Olympics that Changed the World is a 2008 book by David Maraniss published by Simon & Schuster of New York, London, Toronto, and Sydney in July, 2008.

References

External links
Presentation by Maraniss on Rome 1960 at the Free Library of Philadelphia, July 10, 2008, C-SPAN
Q&A interview with Maraniss on Rome 1960, July 13, 2008, C-SPAN
Presentation by Maraniss on Rome 1960 at the National Book Festival, September 27, 2008, C-SPAN

2008 non-fiction books
1960 Summer Olympics
Simon & Schuster books
Olympic Games books
Books about Rome